The 2014 Football Queensland season was the second season since NPL Queensland commenced as the top tier of Queensland men's football. Below NPL Queensland is a regional structure of ten zones with their own leagues. The strongest of the zones is Football Brisbane with its senior men's competition consisting of five divisions.

The NPL Queensland premiers qualified for the National Premier Leagues finals series, competing with the other state federation champions in a final knockout tournament to decide the National Premier Leagues Champion for 2014.

Men's League Tables

2014 National Premier League Queensland

The National Premier League Queensland 2014 season was played over 24 matches, from March to September 2014.

Finals

2014 Brisbane Premier League

The 2014 Brisbane Premier League was the 32nd edition of the Brisbane Premier League which has been a second level domestic association football competition in Queensland since the Queensland State League was formed in 2008. 12 teams competed, all playing each other twice for a total of 22 rounds.

Finals

2014 Capital League 1

The 2014 Capital League 1 season was the second edition of the Capital League 1 as the third level domestic football competition in Queensland. 12 teams competed, all playing each other twice for a total of 22 matches.

Finals

2014 Capital League 2

The 2014 Capital League 2 season was the second edition of the Capital League 2 as the fourth level domestic football competition in Queensland. 12 teams competed, all playing each other twice for a total of 22 matches.

Finals

2014 Capital League 3

The 2014 Capital League 3 season was the second edition of the Capital League 3 as the fifth level domestic football competition in Queensland. 12 teams competed, all playing each other twice for a total of 22 matches.

Finals

2014 Capital League 4

The 2014 Capital League 4 season was the second edition of the Capital League 4 as the sixth level domestic football competition in Queensland. 8 teams competed, all playing each other three times for a total of 21 matches.

Finals

Women's League Tables

2014 Women's SEQ Premier League

The 2014 Women's South-East Queensland Premier League season was the top level domestic football of women's competition in Queensland. 14 teams competed, all playing each other once in Stage One. The teams then competed in Stage Two, with the top seven teams progressed to Section One, while the bottom seven teams played in Section Two. All teams carried forward results from Stage One, then played the other teams in their section once. Each Stage Two section had its own finals series which featured the top four teams playing off. The winner of the Section One Grand Final was crowned the champion team.

Finals (Section 1)

Finals (Section 2)

Cup Competitions

2014 Canale Travel Cup

Brisbane-based soccer clubs competed in 2014 for the Canale Cup. Clubs entered from the Brisbane Premier League, the Capital League 1, Capital League 2 and Capital League 3. 

This knockout competition was won by Brisbane Strikers. 

The competition was also part of the FQ Cup competition, where the final of the Canale Cup served as the semi-final for the FQ Cup.
The competition was also a qualifying competition for the 2014 FFA Cup. In addition to the Brisbane Strikers, Olympic FC qualified for the final rounds, entering at the Round of 32.

FQ Cup

The competition also served as the Queensland Preliminary rounds for the 2014 FFA Cup. The four semi-finalists qualified for the final rounds of the FFA Cup; Far North Queensland FC (representing North Queensland), Palm Beach (representing South East Queensland), with Brisbane Strikers and Olympic FC representing Brisbane. The four semi-finalists, along with A-League club Brisbane Roar qualified for the final rounds, entering at the Round of 32.

References

2014 in Australian soccer
Football Queensland seasons